Lieutenant General Sir Robert Garrett KCB KH (1794 – 13 June 1869) was Commander of British Troops in China and Hong Kong.

Military career
Garrett was born in Ramsgate, Kent, the son of John Garrett of Ellington House, Isle of Thanet, and Elizabeth Gore. Educated at Harrow School, Garrett was commissioned into the 2nd (The Queen's Royal) Regiment of Foot in 1811. He served in the Peninsular War and was present at the Battle of Fuentes de Oñoro in 1811.

In 1846 he was appointed Commanding Officer of the 46th Regiment of Foot and in 1854 was despatched to the Crimean War where he commanded a Brigade of the 4th Division at the Siege of Sevastopol.

In 1858, he was appointed Commander of British Troops in China and Hong Kong before going on to India where he was General Officer Commanding a Division in Bengal and then in Madras. He returned to England in July 1865 to take command of South-Eastern District.

In retirement he lived in Pall Mall in London.

He was also Colonel of the 43rd Regiment of Foot.

Family
In 1814, he married Charlotte Georgina Sophia Cavendish-Bentinck (1789–1819), daughter of Lord Edward Bentinck and granddaughter of the 2nd Duke of Portland. After her death, in 1821, he married widow Louisa Davaynes, with whom he had a son and a daughter.

References

|-

|-

1794 births
1869 deaths
British Army lieutenant generals
Knights Commander of the Order of the Bath
People educated at Harrow School
Queen's Royal Regiment officers
46th Regiment of Foot officers
British Army personnel of the Napoleonic Wars
British Army personnel of the Crimean War
People from Ramsgate